The 1981 European Figure Skating Championships was a senior-level international competition held at the Olympia Hall in Innsbruck, Austria from February 3 to 8, 1981. Figure skaters competed for the title of European Champion in the disciplines of men's singles, ladies' singles, pair skating, and ice dancing.

Results

Men

Panel of judges:
 Mary Groombridge 
 Tatiana Danilenko 
 Walburga Grimm 
 Gerhardt Bubnik 
 Walter Hüttner 
 Marianne Huguenin 
 Alain Calmat 
 Maria Zuchowicz 
 Björn Elwin 

Substitute judge:
 Heinz Müllenbach

Ladies

 Referee: Sonia Bianchetti 
 Assistant Referee: Elemér Terták 

Panel of judges:
 Pamela Davis 
 Ludwig Gassner 
 Ingrid Linke 
 Liudmila Kubashevskaia 
 Elsbeth Bon 
 Eva von Gamm 
 Radovan Lipovšćak 
 Giovanni De Mori 
 Leena Vainio 

Substitute judge:
 Jürg Wilhelm

Pairs

Panel of judges:
 Monique Petis 
 Jürg Wilhelm 
 Pamela Davis 
 Günter Teichmann 
 Eva von Gamm 
 Władysław Kołodziej 
 Liudmila Kubashevskaia 
 Pál Vásárhelyi 
 Luciana Brasa 

Substitute judge:
 Bojan Lipovscak

Ice dancing

 Referee: Hans Kutschera 
 Assistant Referee: Lawrence Demmy 

Panel of judges:
 Marie-Danielle Wilhelm 
 Armelle van Eybergen 
 Gerhardt Bubnik 
 Heinz Müllenbach 
 Roy Mason 
 Ennio Bernazzali 
 Rolf Zorn 
 István Sugár 
 Igor Kubanov 

Substitute judge:
 Maria Zuchowicz

References

Sources
 Result list provided by the ISU

External links
 results

European Figure Skating Championships, 1981
European Figure Skating Championships
European Figure Skating Championships
1981 European Figure Skating Championships
International figure skating competitions hosted by Austria
Sports competitions in Innsbruck
1980s in Innsbruck
European Figure Skating Championships